Kairys is a Lithuanian language family name. 

The surname may refer to:
Jurgis Kairys (1952, Lithuanian aerobatic pilot and aeronautical engineer
David Kairys (born 1943), American professor of Law
Steponas Kairys, Lithuanian engineer and politician
Donaldas Kairys, Lithuanian basketball player

Lithuanian-language surnames